Michal Miriam Waldiger (born 6 January 1969) is an Israeli lawyer and politician. She is currently a member of the Knesset for the Religious Zionist Party.

Biography
Waldiger was born in Bnei Brak to a family of Polish Jewish heritage. She is the great-granddaughter of Naftoli Trop. She attended a Bnei Akiva Ulpana in Tel Aviv and earned a law degree from Bar-Ilan University. She later became head of a law firm. She served as director of Bat Ami, an organisation for religious Zionist girls carrying out national service.

Entering politics, she was elected to the council of Givat Shmuel in the 2013 local elections as a representative of the Jewish Home. She ran for the local party leadership in the buildup to the 2018 local elections, but stood down from the party's list after being defeated. Prior to the 2021 Knesset elections she was placed second on the Religious Zionist Party list, and was elected to the Knesset as the party won six seats.

Waldiger is married, has five children and lives in Givat Shmuel. She is the great-granddaughter of Naftoli Trop.

References

External links

1969 births
Living people
20th-century Israeli lawyers
21st-century Israeli lawyers
21st-century Israeli women politicians
Bar-Ilan University alumni
Israeli city councillors
Israeli Orthodox Jews
Jewish Israeli politicians
Members of the 24th Knesset (2021–2022)
Members of the 25th Knesset (2022–)
People from Bnei Brak
Religious Zionist Party politicians
The Jewish Home politicians
Women members of the Knesset